The 1964 VMI Keydets football team was an American football team that represented the Virginia Military Institute (VMI) as a member of the Southern Conference (SoCon) during the 1964 NCAA University Division football season. In their 12th year under head coach John McKenna, the team compiled an overall record of 1–9 with a mark of 1–4 in conference play, tying for eighth place in the SoCon.

Schedule

References

VMI
VMI Keydets football seasons
VMI Keydets football